Herbert Fuller (28 December 1902 – 15 October 1993) was a British cyclist. He competed in the sprint event at the 1924 Summer Olympics.

References

External links
 

1902 births
1993 deaths
British male cyclists
Olympic cyclists of Great Britain
Cyclists at the 1924 Summer Olympics
Place of birth missing
20th-century British people